Nobody Knows is a 1920 German silent drama film directed by Lupu Pick and starring Pick, Eduard Rothauser and Edith Posca.

Cast
 Lupu Pick as Richter
 Eduard Rothauser as Brendes
 Edith Posca as Helene Brendes
 Melitta Ferrow as Gerda
 Johannes Riemann as Jörn
 Meinhart Maur as Ein Gast
 Fritz Beckmann as Amtsdiener
 Sophie Pagay as Wirtschafterin

References

Bibliography
 Bock, Hans-Michael & Bergfelder, Tim. The Concise CineGraph. Encyclopedia of German Cinema. Berghahn Books, 2009.

External links

1920 films
Films of the Weimar Republic
German silent feature films
Films directed by Lupu Pick
German black-and-white films
1920s German films